Journal of Modern Periodical Studies is a peer-reviewed academic journal covering the study of modern periodicals published between 1880 and 1950 in the English-speaking world. The journal was established in 2010 and is published twice a year by Penn State University Press.

External links 
 

English-language journals
Penn State University Press academic journals
Biannual journals
Publications established in 2010
History journals